Raymond Joseph Markham (born  January 23, 1958 in Windsor, Ontario) is a former professional ice hockey player who played 14 games in the National Hockey League.  He played with the New York Rangers.

He currently is an assistant coach with the Orchard Lake St. Mary's high school hockey team in Michigan.

References 

http://www.olsmathletics.com/hockey/archives/coaching_staff_2010.htm

1958 births
Living people
Canadian ice hockey centres
Ice hockey people from Ontario
New York Rangers draft picks
New York Rangers players
Sportspeople from Windsor, Ontario